Special student may refer to:

 A non-matriculated student at a United States college or university
 A student enrolled in a special education program